This is list of members of the Argentine Senate from 10 December 2003 to 9 December 2005.

Composition
as of 9 December 2005

Senate leadership

Election cycles 
For the first time since 1973, all seats in the Argentine Senate were renewed in the 2001 legislative election, following the implementation of a new system as per the 1994 constitutional amendment. Under the agreed system, a third of all seats would be renewed for two years (2001–2003), a third for four years (2001–2005), and another third for six years (2001–2007). The term length was decided by draw. Accordingly, two thirds of the senators listed here were elected in 2001: one third for four-year terms (2001–2005) and another third for six-year terms (2001–2007). A third of the senators listed here were elected in 2003 for corresponding six year terms (2003–2009).

List of senators

Notes

References

External links
List on the official website (archived) 

2003-2005
2003 in Argentina
2004 in Argentina
2005 in Argentina